Armand Thomas Hue de Miromesnil (15 September 1723 – 6 July 1796) was a minister of the French Ancien Régime who served as Keeper of the Seals under Louis XVI.  He was brought into the ministry by his patron Maurepas following the ascension of Louis XVI and the dissolution of the Maupeou ministry, taking office alongside Turgot and Malesherbes.

1723 births
1796 deaths
Ancien Régime office-holders